Westhaven Nunatak is a prominent nunatak, 2,240 m, standing 3 nautical miles (6 km) south of Turnstile Ridge in the northwest part of Britannia Range. It is the westernmost rock outcrop in this part of the range. The Darwin Glacier Party of the Commonwealth Trans-Antarctic Expedition set up a survey station on its summit in December 1957. The name was suggested by Squadron-Leader J.R. Claydon, RNZAF, who first saw the feature from the air.

Nunataks of Oates Land